All the Brothers Were Valiant is a 1953 Technicolor adventure drama film produced by Metro-Goldwyn-Mayer and directed by Richard Thorpe. The film's screenplay was written by Harry Brown and based on the 1919 novel All the Brothers Were Valiant by Ben Ames Williams. The music score was led by Miklós Rózsa and the cinematography by George J. Folsey.

The film is a remake of the 1923 silent film starring Lon Chaney and produced by Metro Pictures (a forerunner of MGM). The 1923 film and a 1928 MGM version titled Across to Singapore are now both considered lost.

Plot 

In the South Pacific, two brothers love the same woman. They fight over her and a bag of pearls on the floor of a lagoon. One of the brothers redeems himself by helping to prevent a mutiny.

Cast

Production
MGM bought the rights to the novel in 1936. Following the success of Captains Courageous, the studio announced that it would produce the film, to star Robert Taylor and Spencer Tracy. However, plans were postponed.

In November 1951, the film was reactivated as a vehicle for Taylor and Stewart Granger. Elizabeth Taylor was originally announced for the female lead.

Filming began on location in Jamaica in early 1953 with Granger and Betta St. John. While the unit was on location, Elizabeth Taylor, who had just given birth, was replaced by Ann Blyth.

Granger later called the film a "crappy melodrama" but admitted: "I had an OK villain's part." He said that the studio forced him to take the role instead of that which he truly wanted, the lead in Mogambo. He claimed that he had been promised the Mogambo role but that Dore Schary had reneged and given the role to Clark Gable. Granger enjoyed working with Robert Taylor, saying that Taylor "was the easiest person to work with but he had been entirely emasculated by the MGM brass who insisted that he was only a pretty face. He was convinced he wasn't really a good actor and his calm acceptance of this stigma infuriated me. He was such a nice guy, Bob, but he had even more hang-ups than I had."

Lewis Stone died six months after completing filming.

Reception
The film received an Academy Award nomination for Best Color Cinematography (George J. Folsey).

In a contemporary review for The New York Times, critic Bosley Crowther panned the film: "What it all boils down to, in essence, is a lot of pseudo-salty South Seas whoop-de-do, put together with little distinction and without going off the studio lot."

Box office
According to MGM records, the film earned $2,004,000 at the North American box office and $2,624,000 elsewhere. It recorded a profit of $958,000.

In France, the film recorded admissions of 1,909,704.

Proposed follow-up
In July 1953, MGM announced that it had optioned Black Pawl, another sailing adventure novel written by Ben Ames Williams. Although MGM intended the film as a follow-up to All the Brothers Were Valiant and planned to again cast Robert Taylor and Stewart Granger, the project did not come to fruition.

References

External links
 
 
 
 

1950s adventure drama films
1953 romantic drama films
1953 films
1950s historical adventure films
American historical adventure films
American adventure drama films
American romantic drama films
Films directed by Richard Thorpe
Remakes of American films
Sound film remakes of silent films
Metro-Goldwyn-Mayer films
Films about whaling
Films set in Oceania
Films set in the 1850s
Films set on islands
Seafaring films
Treasure hunt films
Films scored by Miklós Rózsa
Films with screenplays by Harry Brown (writer)
Films about brothers
American historical romance films
1950s English-language films
1950s American films